Normal Township is located in McLean County, Illinois. As of the 2010 census, its population was 52,560 and it contained 18,861 housing units.  The majority of the township is occupied by the town of Normal.

Geography

Demographics

References

External links
City-data.com
Illinois State Archives

Townships in McLean County, Illinois
Bloomington–Normal
Townships in Illinois